Anania is both a surname and a given name. Notable people with the name include:

 Anania Shirakatsi (610–685), mathematician, astronomer and geographer
 Bartolomeu Anania (born 1921), bishop, translator, writer and poet
 George Anania (1941–2013), Romanian writer
 Anania Muhingi (born 1994) businessman from Kashenyi Murongo-Karagwe Kagera, Tanzania 
 Michael Anania (born 1939), American poet, novelist, and essayist

See also 
 Ananias (disambiguation)

References